EEP or Eep may refer to:

 Early Entrance Program (CSU), of the California State University
 Early Entrance Program, of the University of Washington; see Transition School and Early Entrance Program
 Education Equality Project, an American educational organization
 Eep, a fictional character in the movie The Croods, its sequel and a TV series
 "Eep, Opp, Ork, Ah-ah!", a song in the U.S. TV series The Jetsons
 Ethiopian Electric Power
 European Endangered Species Programme
 European Environmental Press
 Export Enhancement Program, of the United States Department of Agriculture
 Extraspinal ependymoma, a type of ependymoma tumor
 UK Educational Evidence Portal